Cowlic or Kawulk (O'odham) name translates as "The Hill", is a census-designated place (CDP) in Pima County, Arizona, United States. The population was 147 as of the 2020 census. It is located on the Tohono O'odham Nation reservation.

Demographics
At the 2020 census there were 147 people, 32 households, and 24 families living in the CDP.  The population density was 178 people per square mile. There were 42 housing units.

The median household income was $20,620. The per capita income for the CDP was $11,415.

Toponymy
It has frequently been noted on lists of unusual place names.

References

Census-designated places in Pima County, Arizona
Populated places in the Sonoran Desert
Tohono O'odham Nation